Devanathaswamy Temple is a Siva temple in Peraiyur in Pudukkottai district in Tamil Nadu (India).

Vaippu Sthalam
It is one of the shrines of the Vaippu Sthalams sung by Tamil Saivite Nayanar Sundarar.

Presiding deity
The presiding deity is known as Devanathaswamy as well as Devanathar. The Goddess is known as Devanayaki.

Speciality
This place was known as Devamalai and Perumanallur.

Another Shiva temple
There is also another Shiva temple in Peraiyur, known as Naganathaswamy Temple.

References

Hindu temples in Pudukkottai district
Shiva temples in Pudukkottai district